Hey World! is the second album by Ziggy Marley and the Melody Makers, released in 1986.

Production
Although now credited to Ziggy Marley and the Melody Makers, Ziggy and Stephen Marley shared the songwriting and singing. The album was produced by David Marley, Tyrone Downie, Ricky Walters, and Grub Cooper.

Critical reception
AllMusic wrote that "the song arrangements and production may sound terribly dated today, but the strength of the songwriting, by both Ziggy and the fast maturing Stephen, and the pair's emotive vocal deliveries still pack a powerful punch and a keen vision." Trouser Press called the album "wonderful," writing that "the Melody Makers bend delightfully light reggae grooves to new stylistic ends." The Los Angeles Times wrote that Ziggy's "social and political commentaries bristle with informed insights, pointed observations and pithy pleas—all rather amazing from someone still in his teens."

Track listing
"Give a Little Love" (Albert Hammond, Diane Warren)
"Get Up Jah Jah Children"
"Hey World!"
"Fight to Survive"
"Freedom Road"
"Say People"
"666"
"Police Brutality"
"Lord We a Come"
"Reggae Revolution"

Personnel
Ziggy Marley - vocals, guitar, percussion, synthesizer, backing vocals
Stephen Marley - vocals, backing vocals
Chinna Smith, Jimmy Haynes, Ricky Walters, Steve Golding - guitar
Alvin Ewen, Robbie Shakespeare - bass
Sly Dunbar - drums
Ashley "Grub" Cooper - drums, piano
Robbie Lyn, Tyrone Downie - piano
Andrew P. Richardson - saxophone
Charles E. Beasley - trumpet
Cedella Marley, Sharon Marley - backing vocals
Rita Marley - executive producer

References

Ziggy Marley and the Melody Makers albums
1986 albums
EMI Records albums